Balesar Durgawatan  is a panchayat village in the state of Rajasthan, India,  Administratively, Balesar Durgawatan is under Balesar tehsil of Jodhpur District in Rajasthan.

There are two villages in the Balesar Durgawatan gram panchayat: Balesar Durgawatan and Deonagar.

Geography
Balesar Durgawatan is located in the Thar Desert at an elevation of 250 meters above mean sea level. The village is 8 km northeast of National Highway 114 at Balesar Satan.

Demographics 
In the 2001 census, the village of Balesar Durgawatan had 5,221 inhabitants, with 2,747 males (52.6%) and 2,474 females (47.4%), for a gender ratio of 901 females per thousand males.

Notes

External links 
 

Villages in Jodhpur district